Conus dedonderi is a species of sea snail, a marine gastropod mollusk in the family Conidae, the cone snails, cone shells or cones.

These snails are predatory and venomous. They are capable of "stinging" humans.

Description
The shell of C. Dedonderi is a small, white, rigid, cone like shape which can vary between 14mm to 20mm in length.

Distribution
This marine species occurs off the Southern Philippines.

References

 Goethaels R. & Monsecour D. (2013) A new species of Rolaniconus (Gastropoda: Conidae) from the Philippines. Novapex 14(2): 35-37
 Puillandre N., Duda T.F., Meyer C., Olivera B.M. & Bouchet P. (2015). One, four or 100 genera? A new classification of the cone snails. Journal of Molluscan Studies. 81: 1-23

External links
 To World Register of Marine Species
 

dedonderi
Gastropods described in 2013